Jo Young-nam (hanja:趙英男; born April 2, 1945) is a South Korean singer-songwriter and painter, writer, and television personality. He became very popular as soon as he debuted as a singer in 1968. Jo married actress Youn Yuh-jung in 1974, but divorced in 1987.

References

1945 births
Living people
South Korean male singers
South Korean television presenters
South Korean radio presenters
South Korean painters
Seoul National University alumni
Baecheon Jo clan